This is a list of notable Acadians, and people of Acadia origins.

To be included in this list, the person must have a Wikipedia article showing they are Acadian or must have references showing they are Acadian and are notable.

Actors
Matthew Steven LeBlanc – actor, known for TV show Friends. Both of his father's parents are of Acadian ancestry. Descendant of Daniel Leblanc.
Robert Maillet – actor, professional wrestler from Sainte-Marie-de-Kent, New Brunswick
Patricia McKenzie – actress born in Les Îles-de-la-Madeleine (Painchaud family)
Philip Bourneuf - actor born in Somerville, Massachusetts.  His parents,  Ambrose Bourneuf and Josephine Comeau, are of Acadian ancestry.  His mother was born in Clare, Nova Scotia as were his paternal grandparents.
Ryan Doucette - actor from Clare, Nova Scotia.

Law and politics
Aubin-Edmond Arsenault – former Premier of Prince Edward Island (1917–1919)
Joseph-Octave Arsenault – first Acadian Prince Edward Island member of the Canadian Senate
Télésphore Arsenault – Canadian politician, business manager and farmer
Marcel Arsenault – Philanthropist Billionaire, donated all his wealth to charity
Guy Arseneault - Provincial MLA and Former Member of the House of Commons of Canada (1988 to 1997)
Michel Bastarache – Supreme Court of Canada (1997–2008)
Léopold Belliveau - first Acadian mayor of Moncton, New Brunswick
Edmond Blanchard – chief justice of the Court Martial Appeal Court of Canada, former politician
Gérald Clavette – New Brunswick politician
Ambroise-Hilaire Comeau - first Acadian from Nova Scotia to be a member of the Canadian Senate
Gerald Comeau - former member of the Canadian Senate
Chris d'Entremont – Nova Scotia MLA, Minister of Health and Acadian Affairs
Ray Frenette – former Premier of New Brunswick (1997-1998)
Brian Gallant – former Premier of New Brunswick (2014-2018)
Arthur J. LeBlanc - former Justice of the Supreme Court of Nova Scotia (1998 - 2017) and Lieutenant-Governor of Nova Scotia (2017)
Dominic LeBlanc — Canadian MP and cabinet minister (son of Roméo LeBlanc)
Neil LeBlanc – Consul General to Boston, Massachusetts, and former Nova Scotia MLA, Minister of Finance
Roméo LeBlanc – politician and journalist, former Governor-General of Canada (1995-1999)
Viola Léger – former senator and actress
Pascal Poirier – first Acadian member of the Canadian Senate (served from 1885 to 1933)
Louis Robichaud – former Premier of New Brunswick (1960-1970)
Camille Thériault – former Premier of New Brunswick (1998-1999)
Robert Thibault – Canadian Liberal MP
Peter J. Veniot – former Premier of New Brunswick (1923-1925)

Military veterans
Pierre Maisonnat dit Baptiste
Alexandre Bourg
Joseph Broussard (Beausoleil)
Louis Amand Bujold (Armand Bigeau)
 Jacques Coste
Charles de Saint-Étienne de la Tour
Bernard-Anselme d'Abbadie de Saint-Castin
Jean-Vincent d'Abbadie de Saint-Castin
Joseph d'Abbadie de Saint-Castin
Paul Doucet (alias Paul Laurent) – pilot for French Navy during King George's War
François Dupont Duvivier
Joseph-Nicolas Gautier and his wife
Joseph Godin dit Bellefontaine, Sieur de Beauséjour – Commander of the Acadian Militia of the St-John River valley (St. John River Campaign)
William Johnson (Guillaume Jeanson) – Battle of Bloody Creek (1757)
Bernard Marres 'Marc' dit La Sonde – fought the British at Canso, Nova Scotia (1718)
Abel LeBlanc – Petit de Grat, NS, West Nova Scotia Regiment, wounded while in combat in Italy.
Joseph LeBlanc, dit Le Maigre
 Rene LeBlanc – from Minas, worked for Villebon during King William's War 
Pierre Melanson – from Minas, worked for Villebon during King William's War, appointed "captain of the coast"
Charles Pelerain (Tuck) – pilot for French Navy during King George's War
 Charles Raymond
Pierre II Surette
  Simon Thibodeau – American Revolution 
 Joseph Trahan – Battle of the Plains of Abraham
 Joseph Winniett – supported the British; grandchild of Pierre Maisonnat dit Baptiste

Musicians
Angèle Arsenault – singer-songwriter, media host
Marcel Aymar – singer
Édith Butler – singer-songwriter
Zachary Richard - singer-songwriter
Julie Doiron – singer-songwriter
Patsy Gallant – singer and actress
Boozoo Chavis – singer-songwriter
Wilfred Le Bouthillier – singer
Lisa LeBlanc – singer-songwriter
Anna Malenfant – contralto and composer
Natasha St-Pier – singer
Radio Radio – hip hop group; Jacques Doucet, Alexandre Bilodeau, Gabriel Malenfant
Fayo – singer-songwriter
Yvette Tollar – jazz singer, composer
Roch Voisine – singer-songwriter
P'tit Belliveau – singer-songwriter, guitarist, composer
Clarence White – guitarist

Sports
Louis Cyr – weightlifter, "Strongest Man in the World"
Eric Cyr – MLB player
Paul Cyr – NHL player
Jean Béliveau – Hockey Hall of Fame, Montreal Canadiens
Luc Bourdon – NHL player
Leo Burke (Leonce Cormier) – wrestler
Jean-Louis Cormier (Rudy Kay) – wrestler
Rhéal Cormier – Major League Baseball pitcher
Yvon Cormier (The Beast) – wrestler
René Duprée – wrestler
Yvon Durelle – boxer
Suzanne Gaudet – curler
Ron Guidry – Major League baseball pitcher
Lance Cormier - Major League Baseball Pitcher
Bobby Hebert- NFL Quarterback New Orleans Saints
Camille Henry – NHL player, winner of the Lady Byng Trophy and the Calder Memorial Trophy
Bobby Kay (Romeo Cormier) – wrestler
Jacques LeBlanc – boxer
Robert Maillet – wrestler
Roland Melanson – NHL goalie
Chad Ogea – Major League Baseball pitcher
Dustin Poirier – Mixed martial arts fighter  
 Henri Richard – Hockey Hall of Fame, Montreal Canadiens
 Maurice Richard – Hockey Hall of Fame, Montreal Canadiens
Ryan Theriot – Major League Baseball infielder

Visual artists
Anne-Marie Sirois – artist

Writers
Gilbert Buote – educator, publisher and author
Anselme Chiasson - Catholic priest, educator, writer
Herménégilde Chiasson – writer, ex-lieutenant-governor of New Brunswick
Joey Comeau – writer, comic creator
France Daigle – writer and playwright
Andrea Doucet – sociologist and writer
Clive Doucet – writer
Placide Gaudet - historian, educator, genealogist and journalist.  His research and papers play an important role in the preservation of the Acadian history.
Valentin Landry – journalist and educator
Émilie Leblanc – Acadian activist and educator
Gérald Leblanc – poet
Louis Haché – writer, translator, historian
Antonine Maillet – writer and playwright; Prix Goncourt 1979
Alden Nowlan – poet, novelist, and playwright
Marie-Colombe Robichaud – writer and playwright

Media
Phil Comeau – film and television director; 92 film awards, Order of Canada, Order of New Brunswick
Lyse Doucet – news correspondent and presenter, BBC World

Pre-deportation 
David Basset – trader and privateer
Joseph Broussard (Beausoleil)
Noel Doiron – leader of the Acadians; died in the single greatest tragedy of the Expulsion, the sinking of the Duke William
Joseph-Nicolas Gautier – merchant trader and Acadian militia leader
Daniel LeBlanc – immigrant and progenitor of the LeBlanc family, the largest Acadian family at the time of the deportation
Pierre LeBlanc – early settler of Pointe-de-l'Église, Nova Scotia
Bernard Marot (fl. 1590–1650), French surgeon and ship's captain.
Philippe Mius d'Entremont – Lieutenant-major under Charles de Saint-Étienne de la Tour, who, in 1653, awarded him the first fief in Acadia, the Barony of Pobomcoup (currently Pubnico, Nova Scotia ). He later became the King's Attorney in Acadia
Joseph d'Abbadie de Saint-Castin – military officer and Abenaki chief
Pierre II Surette – Acadian resistance leader and co-founder of Ste. Anne du Ruisseau, Nova Scotia
Jeanne Dugas – wife of Pierre Bois, one of the co-founders of Chéticamp, Nova Scotia

See also
List of First Nations peoples

List of Cajuns

List of Louisiana Creoles

List of people by nationality

References

Acadians